Thomas B. Edlefsen (born December 12, 1941) is a former professional tennis player from the United States.

Career
Edlefsen was a member of three NCAA Championship winning teams while at the University of Southern California, in 1963, 1964 and 1966. He was a three time All-American.

He won the U.S. National Hardcourt doubles titles in 1963 and 1965.

At the U.S. National Indoors in 1964, Edlefsen had wins over both Arthur Ashe and Roy Emerson.

In 1967, he developed a nerve disease, Guillain–Barré syndrome, after suffering a reaction to a smallpox vaccination he had while with the Air Force Reserves. He was left with total paralysis.

He recovered after six months in hospital and returned to tennis, notably making the fourth round at the 1968 Wimbledon Championships, along the way defeating 14th seed Cliff Drysdale. Raymond Moore defeated him in the fourth round over five sets.

In 1972, Edlefsen won a singles title at the Kansas City Open and a doubles title at the Washington Indoor tournament.

Grand Prix/WCT career finals

Singles: 1 (1–0)

Doubles: 3 (1–2)

References

External links 
 
 
 

1941 births
Living people
American male tennis players
Tennis people from California
USC Trojans men's tennis players
People with Guillain–Barré syndrome